Kaitlyn Melton (born June 23, 1992) is an American actress. She is best known for playing as Daphne Blake in two Scooby-Doo live-action prequel films, Scooby-Doo! The Mystery Begins and Scooby-Doo! Curse of the Lake Monster.

Robert Lloyd in Los Angeles Times wrote that she did "splendid work"  as "resourceful Daphne" in Scooby-Doo! The Mystery Begins.

She is from Edmond, Oklahoma.

She currently works as a coach, teaching young people how to become an actor and get TV roles.

Selected filmography

References

External links

1992 births
American child actresses
American film actresses
American television actresses
Living people
Actresses from Oklahoma City
People from Edmond, Oklahoma
21st-century American actresses